Orgiana is an Italian surname. Notable people with the surname include:

Benito Orgiana (1938–2021), Italian politician
Salvatore Orgiana (born 1973), Italian long-distance runner

See also
Oriana

Italian-language surnames